Dale Puren is an Australian rugby league footballer who played in the 1950s and 1960s for North Sydney, South Sydney and Western Suburbs as a winger.

Playing career
Puren made his first grade debut for Western Suburbs in 1953 and played 10 games for the club before switching to South Sydney.  In 1955, Puren won a premiership with Souths in his first year at the club as they defeated Newtown 12-11 in the grand final.  By this stage, Souths had already claimed 4 premiership victories in the 1950s but were unable to add to that tally losing preliminary finals in 1956 and 1957 with Puren being a member of those squads.  After most of the Souths stars had retired or moved on, the club went through a period of decline but Puren stayed loyal to the team playing with the side until the end of 1959.  In 1961, Puren joined North Sydney and played one season for the club making 9 appearances scoring two tries before retiring.

References

1933 births
Living people
Australian rugby league players
South Sydney Rabbitohs players
Western Suburbs Magpies players
North Sydney Bears players
Rugby league players from Sydney
Rugby league wingers